Elizabeth Riddle Graves (23 January 1916 – 6 January 1972) was a pioneer in the physics of neutrons and the detection and measurement of fast neutrons. During World War II, she worked in the Metallurgical Laboratory and at the Los Alamos Laboratory, becoming a group leader there after the war.

Life and education
Elizabeth Riddle was born in Nashville, Tennessee, on 23 January 1916 to James Marion Riddle from South Carolina and Georgia Clymetra Boykin from Arkansas. She had two brothers, James Marion Riddle Jr. and John Burwell Boykin Riddle. Around 1921, the Riddle family moved to Chicago, Illinois.

Riddle entered the University of Chicago, where she was known as "Diz". She earned her Bachelor of Science degree in physics in 1936, and developed a keen interest in the physics of neutrons, particularly the detection and measurement of fast neutrons. She earned her PhD in 1940, writing her thesis on the "Energy Released from Be 9 (d, α) Li 7 and the Production of Li 7" under the supervision of Samuel K. Allison.

While there, she met and married Alvin C. Graves, a fellow physics major. Jobs were hard to find during the Great Depression. Alvin remained at the University of Chicago as a research fellow and an assistant professor until 1939, when he moved to the University of Texas, but Elizabeth was unable to secure a job there as well due to its anti-nepotism rules, which tended to discriminate against women.

On the day of May 21, 1946, Elizabeth was confronted with a disturbing incident. Her husband, Alvin Graves, was in the room with seven other men when Canadian physicist Louis Slotin accidentally slipped and filled the room with a “blue ionization glow” during a routine test. Slotin knew he had absorbed a fatal dose of radiation and is believed to have saved the lives of the other scientists in the room. Alvin Graves was standing the closest to Slotin when the incident occurred. He developed acute radiation sickness and was hospitalized for several weeks. He survived but had chronic neurological and vision problems. Alvin became temporarily bald and developed cataracts in addition to numerous other symptoms related to exposure to neutrons. Louis Slotin asked Elizabeth to calculate whether or not a human could survive that dosage of radiation, referring to Elizabeth’s husband, without telling her about the accident. Elizabeth was a self-proclaimed stoic, reportedly once dismissing Hiroshima as nothing worse than napalm, but “she froze when she learned who the subject of her calculation was.”

Personality 
Colleagues described her as a “very” hard worker and someone who was “very good at her job.” Despite having what was described as a conventional outlook, she was an independent thinker and was able to assert her point of view when she thought it necessary. She was said to have a sense of humor. A story from her colleagues goes that she once had a bet with them that she could persuade a “very proper” European physicist to go through a door before her (it was customary for males to allow a woman through a door before them.) She won the bet by telling the man that she had ripped her dress and “that modesty dictated that he go first.”

The Manhattan Project 
In 1942 Alvin was invited back to the University of Chicago by Arthur H. Compton to join the Manhattan Project's Metallurgical Laboratory.
 Elizabeth found employment there as well, working with Enrico Fermi on the calculations involved in determining the feasibility of a nuclear chain reaction, which eventually led to the development of Chicago Pile-1, the world's first nuclear reactor.

In 1943 they joined the Manhattan Project's Los Alamos Laboratory in New Mexico. Alvin Graves insisted that Elizabeth be allowed to work at Los Alamos as a condition of his participation in the project. According to Howes and Herzenberg in 2003, even if Alvin had not insisted, Elizabeth “probably would have been recruited anyway.”  She was one of the few scientists who knew about fast neutron scattering, which was crucial to nuclear weapon design, and who knew how to operate the Cockcroft–Walton accelerator that had been brought from the University of Illinois.

Employed as a "scientist," which was a high ranking role in the project as compared to "associate scientist" or "junior scientist," Dr. Graves worked as a member of R-division. She contributed greatly to the Project, including measuring cross-sections pertaining to nuclear reactions, measuring neutron multiplication effects in uranium metal, and investigating the different neutron scattering properties of tamper materials considered for use in atomic weapons. She worked on selecting a neutron reflector to “surround the core of the atomic bomb.”

At the time of the Trinity nuclear test in 1945, Elizabeth was seven months pregnant with her first child. They therefore requested that they be assigned to a post far from the blast. They listened to Allison's countdown to the explosion on the radio, and using Geiger counters, they monitored the test's radioactive fallout, which took until the afternoon to reach them. Elizabeth finished an experiment while in labor, timing her contractions with a stopwatch. The child was a healthy daughter, Marilyn Edith. Alvin and Elizabeth had two more children, Alvin Palmer and Elizabeth Anne.

Post-war 
They remained in Los Alamos after the war. Elizabeth became a group leader in the experimental physics division in 1950, and researched neutron interactions with matter and material. She died of cancer at Bataan Memorial Hospital in Albuquerque, New Mexico, on 6 January 1972, and was buried at Guaje Pines Cemetery, Los Alamos, Los Alamos County, New Mexico.

Select publications

Patents
Low voltage 14 MeV neutron source.

Dissertation and thesis
Energy Released from Be 9 (d, α) Li 7 and the Production of Li 7. 1940.

Thesis

Papers

1930s–1940s
Allison, Samuel K., Graves, Elizabeth R., Skaggs, Lester S., & Smith Jr, Nicholas M. (1939). A Precise Measurement of the Mass Difference Be 9 4—Be 8 4; The Stability of Be 8 4. Physical Review. 55(1): 107.
Allison, S. K., Graves, E. R., & Skaggs, L. S. (1940). Alpha-Particle Groups from the Disintegration of Beryllium by Deuterons. Physical Review. 57(2): 158.
Graves, A. C., Graves, E. R., Coon, J. H., & Manley, J. H. (January 1946). Cross Section of D (D, P) H-3 Reaction. Physical Review. 70(1-2): 101.
Manley, J. H., Coon, J. H., & Graves, E. R. (January 1946). Cross Section of D (D, N) He-3 Reaction. Physical Review. 70(1-2): 101. 
Graves, E. R., & Coon, J. H. (January 1946). Disintegrations of Neon and Argon by dd Neutrons. Physical Review. 70(1-2): 101.
Manley, J. H., Agnew, H. M., Barschall, H. H., Bright, W. C., Coon, J. H., Graves, E. R., Jorgensen, T. & Waldman, B. (1946). Elastic Backscattering of d− d Neutrons. Physical Review. 70(9-10): 602.
Barschall, Henry Herman, Battat, M. E., Bright, W. C., Graves, E. R., Jorgensen, T., & Manley, J. H. (1947). Measurement of Transport and Inelastic Scattering Cross Sections for Fast Neutrons. II. Experimental Results. Physical Review. 72(10): 881.
Graves, E. R. (1949). Mayer. Physical Review. 76(1): 183.
Graves, E. R., Rodrigues, A. A., Goldblatt, M., & Meyer, D. I. (1949). Preparation and use of tritium and deuterium targets. Review of Scientific Instruments. 20(8): 579-582.am

1950s–1960s
Coon, J. H., Graves, E. R., & Barschall, H. H. (1952). Total Cross Sections for 14-MeV Neutrons. Los Alamos Scientific Laboratory of the University of California.
Graves, E. R., & Rosen, L. (January 1952). Energy Spectrum of Neutrons from the Interaction of 14-Mev Neutrons with C, Al, Fe, Cu, Zn, Ag, Cd, Sn, Au, Pb, and Bi. Physical Review. 87(1): 239.
Coon, J. H., Graves, E. R., & Barschall, H. H. (1952). Total Cross Sections for 14-Mev Neutrons. Physical Review. 88(3): 562.
Phillips, D. D., Davis, R. W., & Graves, E. R. (1952). Inelastic Collision Cross Sections for 14-Mev Neutrons. Physical Review. 88(3): 600.
Forbes, S. G., Graves, E. R., & Little, R. N. (1953). Low Voltage 14‐Mev Neutron Source. Review of Scientific Instruments. 24(6): 424-427.
Graves, E. R., & Rosen, Louis. (1953). Distribution in Energy of the Neutrons from the Interaction of 14-MeV Neutrons with some Elements. Physical Review. 89(2): 343.
Graves, E. R., & Davis, Roland W. (1955). Cross sections for nonelastic interactions of 14-Mev neutrons with various elements. Physical Review. 97(5): 1205.
Battat, M. E., & Graves, E. R. (1955). Gamma Rays from 14-Mev Neutron Bombardment of C 12. Physical Review. 97(5): 1266.
McDole, C. J., Graves, E. R., & Davis, R. W. (1955). Calibration of a Mock Fission Neutron Source by Indium Resonance Mapping of the Standard Graphite Pile (No. LA-1982). Los Alamos Scientific Lab., New Mexico.
Seagrave, J. D., Graves, E. R., Hipwood, S. J., & McDole, C. J. (1958). D (d, n) 3 He and T (d, n) 4 He Neutron Source Handbook. Los Alamos Scientific Laboratory Lams, 2162.
Graves, E. R. (1963). Howard Eberline Neutron Survey Instrument PNC-1 Evaluation and Recommendation for Use. (No. LA-2860). Los Alamos Scientific Lab., New Mexico.
Davis, R. W., & Graves, E. R. (1969). The Radiation Instrument Calibration Facility at the Los Alamos Scientific Laboratory. (No. LA—4090). Los Alamos Scientific Lab., New Mexico.
Davis, R., & Graves, E. (1969). The Radiation Instrument Calibration Facility at the Los Alamos Scientific Laboratory. (Construction and calibration of radiation survey instruments).

References

1916 births
1972 deaths
People from Nashville, Tennessee
University of Chicago alumni
Los Alamos National Laboratory personnel
Manhattan Project people
20th-century American women scientists
20th-century American physicists
20th-century American inventors
Women inventors
Women on the Manhattan Project